Gedeon Ráday may refer to:
 Gedeon Ráday (writer)  (171392), Hungarian poet, translator and politician, see Ferenc Kazinczy

Gedeon Ráday (minister of defence) (184183), Hungarian politician
Gedeon Ráday (interior minister) (18721937), Hungarian politician